The 1900–01 Copa Macaya was the 1st staging of the Copa Macaya. This tournament is best known for being the very first football competition played on the Iberian Peninsula. The competition was held on the road between 20 January 1901 and ended on 14 April, and it was won by Hispania AC, narrowly beating FC Barcelona by just two points.

Overview
In December 1900, Alfonso Macaya, the then president of Hispania AC, offered a trophy (the Copa Macaya) to the winners of a tournament played on the road featuring six teams from Catalonia: FC Barcelona (1899), Hispania AC (1900), Club Tarragona, Sociedad Franco-Española (1900), Club Espanyol (now RCD Espanyol), and SD Santanach (1900). However, the latter dissolved in the mid-time, with most of its players joining Espanyol, who themselves withdrew from the tournament after the fourth game, thus being disqualified. A committee consisting of Thomas Shields, Ernest Witty and Urruela was formed, which would be in charge of appointing the referees and resolving any problems that might arise during the competition.

The pre-favourites to win the competition were the Barça team because at that time they had great international figures such as John Parsons, the Witty brothers (Arthur and Ernest) and team captain Joan Gamper, with the latter netting a whopping 31 goals in just 6 matches, including two 9-goal hauls and an 8-goal haul. Hispania AC, the organizers of the tournament, was also taken as a contender for the title, having the likes of Carlos Soley, the Morris brothers (Enrique and Samuel) and team captain Gustavo Green, who scored 9 goals including 7 in two matches against Franco. Furthermore, both teams had greatly improved their squads with the recruitment of the best players of the newly-dissolved Escocès FC, a team made up mostly of Scottish workers from a factory in Sant Martí de Provençals. This meant a big leap in quality for both clubs, as Barça recruited George Girvan, Peter Mauchan and Alexander Black, while Hispania acquired Joseph Black, Willie Gold and the team's captain and goalkeeper John Hamilton, who played as a defender due to the club already having an established goalkeeper, Samuel Morris. Interestingly, all of those Scots managed to score at least one goal in the tournament, with both Blacks netting 5 goals each, while Hamilton thrived in his new role at Hispania and enjoyed a great goalscoring form, netting 7 goals in total, although six of them come in a 14–0 trashing of Franco, and Girvan netted the very first competitive goal in Barcelona's history in the first match of the Copa Macaya on 20 January.

On 20 January, the tournament began with a match between the two favorites Barcelona and Hispania, held at the former's home ground (a field in front of the Hotel Casanovas), but despite home ground advantage, it was Hispania who won 2–1 after coming back with two goals from their captain, Gustavo Green. This result proved to be decisive in the outcome of the tournament since the rest of the participating teams basically played a "formality role", as Barcelona and Hispania beat them all with thrashings (both teams beat Franco 14–0 at home), thus the title was only decided when they met again, now at Hispania's home ground, on the last matchday on 14 April, with Hispania having 14 points against Barcelona's 12, thus if the latter achieved victory, the title would have to be decided with a tiebreaker, a play-off. In the first half, Hispania went ahead thanks to an own goal from an undetermined Barcelona player, and then managed to resist Barça's siege largely thanks to their goalkeeper, Samuel Morris, who conceded a goal from Gamper in the second half, which was too little too late and the game ended in a 1–1 tie, which proved to be enough for Hispania to become the first Catalan champion in history. But this historic meeting was not without controversy, since the referee annulled a second goal from Barcelona (scored by John Parsons) for offside, a decision that was heavily contested, with Barça claiming bias refereeing in favor of the organizers of the tournament.

Other notable results include 13–0 and 18–0 trashings of Barça over Franco-Española and Club Tarragona respectevely, in which Gamper netted a resounding 9 goals in each game. Barcelona then trashed Franco again 14–0 in a game that lasted only 60 minutes, with Gamper scoring "only" 8 this time. Coincidentally, Hispania also beat Franco by a score of 14–0, with 6 goals from Hamilton, and a hat-trick from both Green and Black.

Naturally, as it was the first contest to be held in Spain, debuts were a common thing, and on 10 February, in a match between Club Tarragona and Espanyol, the former played their first official match since until that date it had only played training matches among teammates, with some of its members having gone to Barcelona beforehand to watch some matches and find out about the rules of this sport. Furthermore, Espanyol become the first team from Barcelona to travel to outside the province of Barcelona when they went to Tarragona to face said opponent.

On 10 March 1901, Espanyol faced Hispania in a match that turned out to be a real disaster. The referee did not show up; the ground (Muntaner), which was making its official debut (until then Frare Blanch), had a slight incline at various points; the goal frames fell twice, two Espanyol players had to leave the field of play due to injuries, and in the face of such an accumulation of nonsense, Espanyol chose to leave the field before the end of the match, thinking of raising a protest against the competition committee, but they gave up from the idea knowing that the committee would always rule in favor of Hispania. The last straw came a few days later against Franco, when the referee failed to show up for Espanyol's fixture again, and being this the second time it happened along with the incidents of their match with Hispania, Espanyol decides to withdraw from the tournament.

Table

Results

Statistics

Top Scorers

Trophy
Many believed that the prize of the contest would correspond to the importance that some gave it with statements of "valuable artistic cup", or "magnificent gold cup", but they were left disappointed when they saw it was just a normal cup. The long duration of the contest (3 months), the constitution of a Committee, the travel expenses that the clubs were forced to incur were sufficient reasons to believe that the value and richness of the cup was true.

See also
Copa Macaya
Catalan football championship
1902 Copa de la Coronación
1900–01 FC Barcelona season

References

External links
Federació Catalana de Futbol 
CIHEFE 

Copa Catalunya seasons